Dom on the Spot was a British factual documentary series hosted by Dom Littlewood produced by Twofour for BBC One about fixed penalty notices, also known as on the spot fines. The series began on 5 September 2016, and a second series aired in 2017.

Episodes

References

External links
 

2016 British television series debuts
2010s British documentary television series
BBC high definition shows
BBC television documentaries
English-language television shows